Put Your Love in Me may refer to:

 A 1977 hit single by Hot Chocolate
 Put Your Love in Me: Love Songs for the Apocalypse, an album by The Plasmatics